The Northwestern Journal of Technology and Intellectual Property is a law review published by an independent student organization at Northwestern University School of Law.

Overview
The Northwestern Journal of Technology and Intellectual Property covers academic, business, and legal issues concerning intellectual property and technology law. It publishes articles on a variety of topics including: copyright, trademark, patents, the Internet, media, telecommunications, health care, antitrust, e‑discovery, and trial and litigation technology.

The Northwestern Journal of Technology and Intellectual Property publishes three full issues each year.

Symposia
Every Spring, the journal hosts a symposium on emerging areas of technology and intellectual property law. Symposia have included: "New Rules for a New Day: Examining Recent Trends in IP Law" (2010) and "Riding the Wave: Understanding Recent Developments in IP Law" (2009).

Notable articles

References

External links

Nw. J. Tech. & Intell. Prop. sample

American law journals
Technology law journals
Intellectual property law journals
Journal of Technology and Intellectual Property
Publications established in 2002
English-language journals
Triannual journals
2002 establishments in Illinois